Sheldon George "Don" Pooley, Jr. (born August 27, 1951) is an American professional golfer who has won tournaments on both the PGA Tour and the Champions Tour.

Pooley was born in Phoenix, Arizona. He grew up in Riverside, California. He attended the University of Arizona in Tucson, where he was a member of the golf team. He turned pro in 1973.

Despite winning the 1980 B.C. Open and the 1987 Memorial Tournament, Pooley is probably best remembered in his PGA Tour career for his dramatic million-dollar hole-in-one at the 1987 Bay Hill Classic. Pooley received $500,000 as did Arnold Palmer Hospital for Children and Women in Orlando, Florida because of this once-in-a-lifetime shot. In 1985, he won the Vardon Trophy, awarded annually by the PGA to the Tour leader in scoring average. His best finish in a major was T-5 in consecutive major championships – the 1987 PGA Championship and the 1988 Masters Tournament.

Late in his PGA Tour career, Pooley began to experience many debilitating ailments, and missed several years of playing time as a result; however, he enjoyed a resurgence in his career after turning 50 in August 2001 when he began play on the Champions Tour. The biggest win in his golf career was his first on the Champions Tour. In 2002, he won on the biggest stage in men's senior golf, the U.S. Senior Open. Pooley was inducted into the Pima County (Arizona) Sports Hall of Fame in 2006.

Professional wins (7)

PGA Tour wins (2)

Other wins (3)
1983 Jerry Ford Invitational (tie with Gil Morgan)
1989 Ebel Match Play
1992 Amoco Centel Championship

Champions Tour wins (2)

Champions Tour playoff record (1–2)

Results in major championships

CUT = missed the half-way cut
"T" indicates a tie for a place

Summary

Most consecutive cuts made – 12 (1982 PGA – 1988 Masters)
Longest streak of top-10s – 2 (1987 PGA – 1988 Masters)

Champions Tour major championships

Wins (1)

1 In the three-hole aggregate playoff, Pooley and Watson tied with three pars each.On the second sudden-death hole, Pooley won with a birdie to Watson's par.

Results timeline
Results not in chronological order before 2012.

The Senior British Open was not a Champions Tour major until 2003.

CUT = missed the halfway cut
WD = withdrew from tournament
"T" indicates a tie for a place

See also 

 Fall 1976 PGA Tour Qualifying School graduates

References

External links

American male golfers
Arizona Wildcats men's golfers
PGA Tour golfers
PGA Tour Champions golfers
Winners of senior major golf championships
Golfers from Phoenix, Arizona
Sportspeople from Tucson, Arizona
Sportspeople from Riverside, California
1951 births
Living people